Mont Albert is a mountain in the Chic-Choc range in the Gaspésie National Park in the Gaspé Peninsula of eastern Quebec, Canada. At , it is one of the highest mountains in southern Quebec, and is popular for hiking.

Mount Albert was named in honour of Prince Albert of Saxe-Coburg and Gotha, husband of Queen Victoria, because geologist Alexander Murray made the first recorded ascent of the mountain on the Prince's birthday, 26 Aug. 1845.

Geography

It includes two summits, Albert North and Albert South. Each of the summits is situated at either side of the plateau.

The principal component of Mont Albert is  an unusual kind of bedrock called serpentine;  this originated as oceanic crust and was then uplifted during the formation of the Appalachian Mountains about 480 million years ago.  The nearly flat serpentine tableland on the mountain's summit is an alpine tundra area above the tree line, and supports a quite distinctive flora with many kinds of endemic and highly disjunct plants.

The ascent of Mount Albert from near sea level is challenging, but popular with hikers, offering a view of the St. Lawrence and the Côte-Nord, the river's north shore, part of the ancient bedrock of the Canadian Shield.

Gallery

References

Landforms of Gaspésie–Îles-de-la-Madeleine
One-thousanders of Quebec
Tourist attractions in Gaspésie–Îles-de-la-Madeleine